Kafi is a classical form of Sufi poetry

Kafi may also refer to:
 Kafi (raga), a raga in Hindustani classical music
 Kafi (thaat), a thaat in Hindustani classical music named after the raga
 Kafi, a 2002 musical album by Turkish musician Akin Eldes
 Ali Kafi (1928–2013), President of Algeria (1992–1994)
 Kitab al-Kafi, a major Shi'a Islamic hadith collection
 Kāfi is a name for a movement in Kuwait and another independent movement in Iraq